Walid Raad (Ra'ad) (Arabic: وليد رعد) (born 1967 in Chbanieh, Lebanon) is a contemporary media artist. The Atlas Group is a fictional collective, the work of which is produced by Walid Raad. He lives and works in New York, where he is currently a professor at the School of Art at the Cooper Union School of Art.

His works to date include film, photography, multimedia installations, and accompanying public performances. All, in one way or another, deal with the contemporary history of Lebanon with particular emphasis on the Lebanese Civil War of 1975–90. The work is also often concerned with the representation of traumatic events of collective historical dimensions; and the ways film, video, and photography function as documents of physical and psychological violence. He is also a member of the Arab Image Foundation.

Early life and education
Walid Raad was born in 1967 in Christian East Beirut to a Palestinian mother and a Lebanese father. Raad's dream was to become a photojournalist. It was his father who gave him his first camera and helped to create a home darkroom. Since his teen years Raad has been introduced to the photographic medium as well as European photography magazines such as Photo, Zoom, and Photo Reporter, where he saw the work of Eugène Atget, Henri Cartier-Bresson, Man Ray, Diane Arbus, and Helmut Newton.

Ra'ad had to leave Beirut in 1983 and relocate to the United States. He received his BFA from the Rochester Institute of Technology in 1989, where he continued focused study of photography. In addition to that he also started taking classes in Middle Eastern studies. He comments: "I never got to learn anything about the history of the Arab world, or the history of Lebanon in a serious way. That training was in the United States."  He went on to complete his MA and Ph.D. in Cultural and Visual Studies at the University of Rochester in 1993 and 1996, respectively. He completed a dissertation based partly on writing by American and European hostages held in Lebanon in the 1980s during the country's civil wars. Working on the dissertation Raad had to encounter extensive work with archives and archival documents, as well as obtaining theoretical literacy, research and presentation skills to meet the demands of a PhD. Those skills Raad will employ throughout his artistic practice.

Work
Raad's video works include Talaeen a Junuub (Up to the South) (Salloum/Raad, 60 min., 1993), I Think It Would Be Better If I Could Weep (6 min.18sec., 2000) a collection of video shorts titled The Dead Weight of a Quarrel Hangs (Raad, 18 min., 1996–1999), and Hostage: The Bachar Tapes (Raad/Bachar), 18 min., 2000). Mixed-media projects include The Atlas Group: Documents from The Atlas Group Archive (1999 to the present), The Loudest Muttering Is Over: Documents from The Atlas Group Archive (2001 to the present), and My Neck Is Thinner Than A Hair (2004).ä

The artists is also a member of the Fondation Arabe pour l’image (FAI), founded in Beirut in 1996, which collects and exhibits photographic testimony from the Arab world. In this context Raad has co-curated with Akram Zaatari the exhibition titled Mapping Sitting: On portraiture and Photography, an investigation in Arab photography and its relationship to questions of identity.

In June 2009, "The Atlas Group (1989-2004)" exhibition opened at the Reina Sofia in Madrid. Undertaken by Raad, the project aimed to research and document the contemporary history of Lebanon, specifically the years between 1975 and 1991. The exhibition - consisting of installations, videos, and photographs - attempts to draw awareness to the various ways in which history is told, organized, and sometimes manipulated. From this perspective The Atlas Group archive's fictional character makes it a kind of counter-archive to the FAI.

Raad has collaborated with Chinese American artist David Diao, and their work was shown in fall 2012 at Paula Cooper Gallery.

The Atlas Group

In the late 1990s Raad created a fictional foundation called The Atlas Group in order to accommodate and contextualise his growing output of works documenting the Lebanese Civil Wars, generally dated 1975–1990. Within Atlas Group Raad produces artworks, addressing the infrastructural, societal, and psychic devastation wrought by the wars, which he then re-dates and attributes to an array of invented figures who in turn are said to have donated these works directly or by proxy to The Atlas Group archive. Regardless of original medium of the documents, Raad processes and outputs all of his work digitally consciously adding another layer of documentary intervention to his overarching fictional conceit. Raad openly states the fictional dimension of the collective simultaneously applying complex methodology and performative dimension of Atlas Group presentation to blur the line between fiction and reality:"In different places and at different times I have called the Atlas Group an imaginary foundation, a foundation I established in 1976, and a foundation established in 1976 by Maha Traboulsi. In Lebanon in 1999, I stated, "The Atlas Group is a nonprofit foundation established in Beirut in 1967." In New York in 2000 and in Beirut in 2002, I stated, "The Atlas Group is an imaginary foundation that I established in 1999." I say different things at different times and in different places according to personal, historical, cultural, and political considerations with regard to the geographical location and my personal and professional relation with the audience and how much they know about the political, economic, and cultural histories of Lebanon, the wars in Lebanon, the Middle East, and contemporary art. I also always mention in exhibitions and lectures that the Atlas Group documents are ones that I produced and that I attribute to various imaginary individuals. But even this direct statement fails, in many instances, to make evident for readers or an audience the imaginary nature of the Atlas Group and its documents."  
Not the least important fact is the dual attribution of dates to all documents within archive: the first are attributions by The Atlas Group, while the second refer to Raad's production of the work. Artworks with only one date are not part of The Atlas Group's "official" archive. The Atlas Group is always presented by Raad through public lectures accompanying public display (film screenings, exhibitions displaying photography, audio, video and a variety of documents from the group's archives). Atlas Group and its digital archive are rooted in Raad's long-term investigation of historiography, archives and the effects of personal and collective trauma on memory and its articulation. Raad intentionally and explicitly employs fictional devices in approaching those themes. For example, a number of core documents from the Atlas Group Archive, several notebooks, series of photographs, and 8-mm films are attributed to the estate of the (fictional) Lebanese historian, Dr. Fadl Fakhouri. Within public presentations Raad, performing the representative of the Atlas Group, articulates the Lebanese Civil Wars as follows: "We do not consider "The Lebanese Civil War" to be a settled chronology of events, dates, personalities, massacres, invasions, but rather we also want to consider it as an abstraction constituted by various discourses, and, more importantly, by various modes of assimilating the data of the world."

More recently, certain sections of the archive have been the object of a number of installations in museum spaces.

Under the name of Atlas Group, Raad made a series of books published by Walther König: a sort of imaginary collection of Dr. Fakhouri's found notebooks reports on Lebanon's 15 year civil war. Atlas Group has been included in two Whitney Biennials in New York (2000 and 2002), Documenta 11in Kassel, Germany (2002) with  the following year his work was included in the Venice Biennale. Raad's first solo exhibition in the United States was held in 2006 at the Kitchen, New York whereas his first solo show in Middle East has happened only 2 years later, at the Galerie Sfeir-Semler in Beirut.

Gulf Labor
Raad is an organizer of Gulf Labor, a coalition of artists and activists organized to bring awareness to issues surrounding the living and working conditions on Abu Dhabi's Saadiyat Island. In May 2015, he was denied entry to Dubai on grounds of "security". In response, the international committee for Modern and contemporary art museums, CIMAM, issued a statement of support of Raad. Shortly after, leading curators from institutions in Asia and India as well as Europe and North America – including Glenn Lowry of the Museum of Modern Art, Nicholas Serota of Tate, and Doryun Chong of M+ – signed an open letter calling on institutions in the West that are working in the Persian Gulf region – the Solomon R. Guggenheim Foundation and the Musée du Louvre, among others – to help lift the travel bans imposed on Raad and Ashok Sukumaran.

Exhibitions
Raad's works have been exhibited at Documenta 11 (Kassel), The Venice Biennale (Venice), The Whitney Biennial (New York), The Ayloul Festival (Beirut, Lebanon), Home Works (curated by Ashkal Alwan, Beirut, Lebanon) and numerous other festivals in Europe, the Middle East, and North America.

Collections
 QAGOMA Queensland Art Gallery | Gallery of Modern Art, Brisbane

Awards 

In 2019, Raad won the Aachen Art Prize but the prize was rescinded after he refused to denounce the BDS movement which calls for a cultural boycott of Israel. In 2004-5, Raad was a Fellow of the Vera List Center for Art and Politics.

References

External links
The Atlas Group Archives
Scratching on Things I Could Disavow
Walid Raad in the Video Data Bank
Artfacts.Net: Walid Ra'ad
village voice > art > Walid Raad/the Atlas Group: Interrogation Nation; Art as a Detective Report by Jerry Saltz
Lecture hosted by Pavilion Magazine on the concept of the contemporary, which centres on the work of Walid Raad under the auspices of the fictional collective The Atlas Group: 'The Fiction of Contemporary: Speculative Collectivity and the Global Transnational', given by Professor Peter Osborne, Director of the Centre for Research in Modern European Philosophy, based at Kingston University
Seminar at Birkbeck on the relation of contemporary art to 'cultural memory' that highlights - and takes its title from - the work of the fictional collective The Atlas Group: '"The Truth Will be Known When the Last Witness is Dead": History Not Memory’, by Professor Peter Osborne, Director of the Centre for Research in Modern European Philosophy, based at Kingston University

1967 births
Living people
Lebanese emigrants to the United States
Video artists
Cooper Union faculty
Rochester Institute of Technology alumni
American artists
Lebanese contemporary artists